Carrie Lucas In Danceland is the third album by Carrie Lucas, released in 1979 on the SOLAR Records label.

Track listing 
 "Danceland" - (Malcolm Anthony) - 6:54 	
 "Sometimes a Love Goes Wrong"  (Ken Hirsch/Amos Milburn) - 4:09 	
 "Are You Dancing" - (Carrie Lucas/William B. Shelby/Norman Beavers) - 6:19 	
 "Dance with You" - (Kossi Gardner) - 6:36 	
 "I'm Gonna Make You Happy" - (Carrie Lucas/William B. Shelby/Norman Beavers) - 4:15 	
 "Southern Star" - (Kossi Gardner) - 6:39

Charts

Album

Singles

Sampling 
 In 1998 JohNick (Johnny "D" De Mairo and Nicholas Palermo Jr.) sampled the song "Dance With You" for the song "The Captain".
 In 1999 DJ/producer Armand Van Helden sampled the song "Dance With You" for his hit "You Don't Know Me", featuring Duane Harden.

References 

1979 albums
SOLAR Records albums
Carrie Lucas albums